Terrence McDonnell is an American television screenwriter and producer, best known for his collaboration with Jim Carlson in the first Battlestar Galactica series. The two of them also wrote the 1988 animated feature film Pound Puppies and the Legend of Big Paw.

Screenwriting credits

Television
 series head writer denoted in bold
The Six Million Dollar Man (1973, 1978)
Gemini Man (1976)
The Life and Times of Grizzly Adams (1978)
CHiPs (1978)
The Bionic Woman (1978)
Battlestar Galactica (1978)
Magnum, P.I. (1981)
The Rousters (1984)
Kidd Video (1984)
The Love Boat (1984)
 Riptide (1985)
M.A.S.K. (1985): season 1 head writer
The Mouse and the Motorcycle (1986)
Danger Bay (1987)
Spiral Zone (1987)
Good Morning, Miss Bliss (1989)
Let’s Make a Deal (1990)
The New Adventures of He-Man (1990)
Beetlejuice (1991)
James Bond Jr. (1991)
Goof Troop (1992)
X-Men (1992)
Candid Camera (1992)
Exosquad (1993)
Quicksilver (1994)
You Don't Know Jack (2001)
1 vs. 100 (2006-2007, 2010-2011)

Films
 Dorothy Meets Ozma of Oz (1987)
 Pound Puppies and the Legend of Big Paw (1988)

External links
 
 GALACTICA.TV interview with Terrence McDonnell (written by Mike Egnor, 17 September 2009)

American male screenwriters
Living people
Year of birth missing (living people)